Nausikaa (minor planet designation: 192 Nausikaa) is a large main-belt S-type asteroid. It was discovered by Johann Palisa on February 17, 1879, at Pula, then in Austria, now in Croatia. The name derives from Nausicaä, a princess in Homer's Odyssey.

This is an S-type asteroid around 86 km with an elliptical ratio of 1.51. The sidereal rotation period is 13.6217 hours.

Based on the lightcurve data obtained from Nausikaa, a possible satellite was reported in 1985. However, this has not been confirmed. A shape model of Nausikaa has been constructed, also based on the lightcurve data. It indicates a roughly cut, but not very elongated body. In 1998 an occultation of a star by the asteroid was observed from the United States.

In 1988 a search for satellites or dust orbiting this asteroid was performed using the UH88 telescope at the Mauna Kea Observatories, but the effort came up empty.

Nausikaa's orbital period is 3.72 years, its distance from the Sun varying between 1.81 and 2.99 AU. The orbital eccentricity is 0.246. Nausikaa brightened to magnitude 8.3 at a quite favorable opposition on 2 September 2011, when it was 1.875 AU from the Sun and 0.866 AU from the Earth.

References

External links 
 
 

Background asteroids
Nausikaa
Nausikaa
S-type asteroids (Tholen)
Sl-type asteroids (SMASS)
18790217
Objects observed by stellar occultation